The castra of Cioroiu Nou was a fort in the Roman province of Dacia. It was erected in the 2nd century AD. Consisting of two ramparts forming a letter "V", the defensive system of the Roman settlement at Cioroiu Nou was complex. The Romans abandoned the fort in the 2nd or in the 3rd century. Its ruins are located in Cioroiu Nou, commune Cioroiași, Romania.

See also
List of castra

External links
Roman castra from Romania - Google Maps / Earth

Notes

Roman legionary fortresses in Romania
History of Oltenia
Historic monuments in Dolj County